The topographic isolation of a summit is the minimum distance to a point of equal elevation, representing a radius of dominance in which the peak is the highest point.  It can be calculated for small hills and islands as well as for major mountain peaks and can even be calculated for submarine summits.

Isolation table
The following sortable table lists Earth's 40 most topographically isolated summits.

Examples 
The nearest peak to Germany's highest mountain, the 2,962-metre-high Zugspitze, that has a 2962-metre-contour is the Zwölferkogel (2,988 m) in Austria's Stubai Alps. The distance between the Zugspitze and this contour is 25.8 km; the Zugspitze is thus the highest peak for a radius of 25.8 km around. Its isolation is thus 25.8 km.
Because there are no higher mountains than Mount Everest, it has no definitive isolation. Many sources list its isolation as the circumference of the earth over the poles or – questionably, because there is no agreed definition – as half the earth's circumference.
After Mount Everest, Aconcagua, the highest mountain of the American continents, has the greatest isolation of all mountains. There is no higher land for 16,534 kilometres when its height is first exceeded by Tirich Mir in the Hindu Kush.
Mont Blanc is the highest mountain of the Alps. The geographically nearest higher mountains are all in the Caucasus.  (4,978 m)  is the reference peak for Mont Blanc.
Musala is the highest peak in Rila mountain, also in Bulgaria and the Balkan Peninsula mountain system; standing at 2,925 m (9,596 ft) it is the 4th most topographically isolated major peak in Continental Europe. With a topographic prominence of 2473 m, Musala is also the 6th highest peak by topographic prominence in mainland Europe.

Gallery

See also
Most isolated major summits of Europe
Table of the most isolated major summits of North America
Table of the most isolated major summits of the United States  
Most isolated mountain peaks of Canada
Most isolated mountain peaks of Mexico
Geodesy
Physical geography
Summit (topography)
Topographic elevation
Topographic prominence
Topography

References

External links
bivouac.com Canadian Mountain Encyclopedia
peakbagger.com
peaklist.org
peakware.com World Mountain Encyclopedia
summitpost.org

Topography
Physical geography
Mountaineering
Lists of mountains by isolation